Robert Crittenden (January 1, 1797 – December 18, 1834) was an American lawyer who served as the first secretary of the Arkansas Territory from 1819 to 1829. He also served as the acting governor of Arkansas Territory from July to December 1819. Crittenden co-founded the Rose Law Firm.

Early life, education, and military service 
Robert Crittenden was born in Woodford County, Kentucky, the son of John and Judith (née Harris) Crittenden. His father was a Kentucky pioneer from Virginia, who had been a major in the Continental Army. Crittenden had a brother, John, who later served as a U.S. senator. His great-nephew was politician Thomas T. Crittenden, Jr. Robert Crittenden was educated privately and read the law as a legal apprentice to prepare for passing the bar.

Secretary of the Arkansas Territory 
President James Monroe appointed Crittenden secretary of the Arkansas Territory in 1819. Crittenden served in this role through 1829. From July to December 1819, he served as acting governor while James Miller was delayed for an extended period en route to Arkansas Territory. Crittenden called the first territorial legislature into session and took responsibility for organizing the new territory. He amassed considerable political power. Crittenden was a primary leader in preparing the territory for statehood. He was appointed as United States Commissioner for negotiating the 1824 Treaty with the Quapaw Indians.

Conway–Crittenden duel 
By 1827, he and his former friend, Henry Conway, a territorial representative, had come into conflict on political issues and finally had a duel. He mortally wounded Conway near Napoleon, Arkansas, on October 29, 1827, who died several days later. Crittenden lived at the end of his life in Vicksburg, Mississippi.

Legacy 
Crittenden County, Arkansas, and the Robert Crittenden Chapter (established January 15, 1951) of the Daughters of the American Revolution in West Memphis, Arkansas, are named after him.

References

External links 

 Robert Crittenden at The Political Graveyard
 The American Era at Historical Marker Database

1797 births
1834 deaths
19th-century American lawyers
19th-century American newspaper founders
American duellists
American lawyers admitted to the practice of law by reading law
American militia officers
Arkansas Democratic-Republicans
Arkansas lawyers
Burials in the United States
Crittenden family
Governors of Arkansas Territory
Law firm founders
Military personnel from Kentucky
Monroe administration personnel
People from Woodford County, Kentucky
United States Army personnel of the Seminole Wars
United States Army personnel of the War of 1812